This list is of the Tangible Folk Cultural Properties of Japan in the Prefecture of Ehime.

National Tangible Folk Cultural Properties
As of 1 July 2015, one property has been designated at a national level.

Prefectural Tangible Folk Cultural Properties
As of 27 March 2015, eight properties have been designated at a prefectural level.

Municipal Tangible Folk Cultural Properties
As of 1 May 2014, a further seventy properties have been designated at a municipal level.

Registered Tangible Folk Cultural Properties
As of 1 July 2015, zero properties have been registered (as opposed to designated) at a national level.

See also
 Cultural Properties of Japan
 List of Important Tangible Folk Cultural Properties

References

External links
  Cultural Properties in Ehime Prefecture

Tangible Folk Cultural Properties
Tangible Folk Cultural Properties of Ehime
Tangible Folk Cultural Properties of Ehime